Newlin is a surname, and may refer to:

Brett Newlin, American rower
Dika Newlin, American musician
Jacquiline Alice Newlin, or 'Alice Day', actress
Kristen Newlin, Turkish-American basketball player
Marceline Newlin, younger sister of Alice
Maury Newlin, Major League Baseball player
Melvin E. Newlin (1948-1967), Medal of Honor recipient
Mike Newlin, American basketball player
Sarah Newlin, fictional character in True Blood
Steve Newlin, fictional character in True Blood

See also